Defending champion Roger Federer defeated Andy Roddick in the final, 4–6, 7–5, 7–6(7–3), 6–4 to win the gentlemen's singles tennis title at the 2004 Wimbledon Championships. It was his second Wimbledon title and his third major title overall. This tournament marked the beginning of Federer's record streak of 23 consecutive major semifinals and 36 consecutive major quarterfinals (in which he made 20 finals and won 14 titles).

This tournament was the final major appearance for 2001 champion Goran Ivanišević, who announced his decision to retire following the tournament. He lost in the third round to 2002 champion Lleyton Hewitt.

Wayne Ferreira made his 55th consecutive main draw major appearance, surpassing the all-time record he had jointly held with Stefan Edberg.

This was the third year in Wimbledon history, after 1991 and 1997, that there was play on the Middle Sunday, due to bad weather in the first week.

Seeds

  Roger Federer (champion)
  Andy Roddick (final)
  Guillermo Coria (second round)
  David Nalbandian (withdrew)
  Tim Henman (quarterfinals)
  Juan Carlos Ferrero (third round)
  Lleyton Hewitt (quarterfinals)
  Rainer Schüttler (third round)
  Carlos Moyá (fourth round)
  Sébastien Grosjean (semifinals)
  Mark Philippoussis (fourth round)
  Sjeng Schalken (quarterfinals)
  Paradorn Srichaphan (first round)
  Mardy Fish (second round)
  Nicolás Massú (first round)
  Jiří Novák (first round)
  Jonas Björkman (third round)
  Feliciano López (third round)
  Marat Safin (first round)
  Tommy Robredo (second round)
  Juan Ignacio Chela (second round)
  Andrei Pavel (second round)
  Max Mirnyi (first round)
  Fernando González (third round)
  Dominik Hrbatý (third round)
  Taylor Dent (third round)
  Robby Ginepri (fourth round)
  Ivan Ljubičić (first round)
  Nicolas Kiefer (first round)
  Vince Spadea (fourth round)
  Mikhail Youzhny (first round)
  Hicham Arazi (third round)
  Luis Horna (first round)

David Nalbandian withdrew due to injury. He was replaced in the draw by the highest-ranked non-seeded player Luis Horna, who became the #33 seed.

Qualifying

Draw

Finals

Top half

Section 1

Section 2

Section 3

Section 4

Bottom half

Section 5

Section 6

Section 7

Section 8

References

External links

 2004 Wimbledon Championships – Men's draws and results at the International Tennis Federation

Men's Singles
Wimbledon Championship by year – Men's singles